Scott Daruda (born 17 February 1986) is an Australian rugby union player. After playing for Manly RUFC he shift North debuting for Bond University. His usual position is either at fly-half or in the centres.

Career

He was born in Arawa, Papua New Guinea. He went on to play for a number of Australian representative sides, such as the under-19s national side in 2004 and the under-21s in 2005. He also played in the Australian Commonwealth Youth Games Sevens.

Scott attended St. Joseph's Nudgee College from 1999–2003. He was a member of Riley House for four of those years, before becoming a pioneer student of Shaw House in its inaugural year. Scott Daruda played for the well-known Nudgee College First XV in 2002 and 2003, and captained the team in his senior year. The 2003 season is considered by many to be one of the toughest seasons on record, with some of the students involved in the competition including Lloyd Johansson, and Karmichael Hunt of the Queensland Reds and Brisbane Broncos respectively.

He signed for the Queensland Reds and made his debut during the 2005 Super 12 season. He then captained the under-19 national Australian side at the World Championships. He then signed for expansion franchise the Western Force.

More recently he has played for Agen in France and from the 2010–12 seasons  in Japan for Kubota Spears.

In the 2012 season he is currently playing for the Manly Marlins, a Sydney team playing in the Shute Shield rugby competition.

References

External links
Western Force profile
Wallabies profile
Match stats

1986 births
Papua New Guinean emigrants to Australia
Australian rugby union players
Brothers Old Boys players
Living people
Papua New Guinean rugby union players
Queensland Reds players
Sydney (NRC team) players
Rugby union centres
Rugby union fly-halves
Western Force players
Kubota Spears Funabashi Tokyo Bay players
SU Agen Lot-et-Garonne players
Expatriate rugby union players in Japan
Expatriate rugby union players in France
Australian expatriate rugby union players
Papua New Guinean expatriate rugby union players
Australian expatriate sportspeople in France
Papua New Guinean expatriate sportspeople in France
Australian expatriate sportspeople in Japan